Celama parvitis is a moth of the family Nolidae first described by George Howes in 1917. It is likely endemic to New Zealand. Specimens have been found in Broad Bay, Otago and Aniseed Valley in Nelson. A specimen was also collected south east of Te Anau where it was described by Charles E. Clarke as being a rare moth that was taken in December amongst Leptospermum. This species has also been collected in December in the Dansey ecological district, near Kakanui, on Helichrysum aggregatum.

References

Moths described in 1917
Moths of New Zealand
Nolidae